The Basilica of St. Mary of the Assumption is a Minor Basilica of the Catholic Church located in Marietta, Ohio, United States.  It is also a parish church of the Diocese of Steubenville.

History

The first Mass celebrated in what is now Marietta was celebrated by the Rev. Joseph de Bonnecamp, S.J. who was the chaplain to a French expedition from Quebec.  The Mass was celebrated at the  confluence of the Muskingum and Ohio Rivers.  There were few Catholics in the early years of the town.  By the 1830s a priest would occasionally visit from Wheeling.  Bishop John B. Purcell of  the Diocese of Cincinnati bought land in Marietta in 1837 and sent a resident priest the following year to establish the parish.  A building on the property was used by the parish for worship until 1853 when the first church building was built.  The building was inundated by floods in 1884, 1891, 1895 and 1898.

The property for the present church was acquired in 1900 after the 1,000-member parish determined it needed to move to higher ground.  The house on the site was moved to the north side of the property and is still in use as the rectory.  Cleveland architect Emile M. Uhlrich designed the church in the Spanish Colonial Revival style.  The ground was broken on July 1, 1903 and Bishop James J. Hartley of the Diocese of Columbus, which St. Mary's became a part of in 1868, laid the cornerstone on June 12, 1904.  The building was enclosed in 1905 and work halted until 1907 while subscriptions were paid off and new funds were raised.  The church was consecrated by Bishop Hartley on December 12, 1909. The stained glass windows were created in Munich, Germany.  

In 1945 St. Mary's transferred to the newly established Diocese of Steubenville. Pope Francis decreed on June 13, 2013 that St. Mary's Church was elevated to the status of a minor basilica.  It was solemnized by Bishop Jeffrey M. Monforton on November 5, 2013.

References

External links

Basilica of St. Mary of the Assumption website

Religious organizations established in 1838 
Roman Catholic churches completed in 1909 
Mary of the Assumption, Marietta
Churches in the Roman Catholic Diocese of Steubenville
Churches in Washington County, Ohio
Buildings and structures in Marietta, Ohio
Spanish Colonial Revival architecture in Ohio
1838 establishments in Ohio
20th-century Roman Catholic church buildings in the United States